Abbateggio is a comune and town in the province of Pescara in the Abruzzo region of Italy.

The first documents about the village's existence date back to the 10th century.

The economy of Abbateggio is based on mixed agriculture. Livestock are kept and crops including grain, olives, vines and fruit trees are grown. Cheese and honey are also produced.

The Cusano district of the comune is home to the ruins of an ancient castle and other early medieval buildings.

Culture
Festivals in the town include:

 San Lorenzo (August) - Grain feast
 7–9 September - Patron festival
 Last Sunday in July - Majella Park Literary Award.

Notable people
Angelo Tomasso Sr, founder of the Tomasso Group, grew up in Abbateggio and immigrated to the United States of America in 1910.

References

External links
Photos and information on Abbateggio
 — article about food in Abbateggio and nearby towns

Cities and towns in Abruzzo